For other films, see Dost

Dost is a 1989 Hindi film directed by  K. Murali Mohana Rao and produced by A. Suryanarayana under Bhanodaya Productions banner. Mithun Chakraborty, Amala played the lead pair of this family drama. The lyrics were written by Indeevar with music composed by R. D. Burman.

Plot
Sher Singh (Amjad Khan) and his son Nagender (Kiran Kumar) are involved in poaching, cutting trees and smuggle them out of the Jungle. They murder forest officer Anthony (Dalip Tahil) and Raja (Mithun Chakravarty) takes charge in his place. Elephant Ram, Monkey Bansi & Parrot Mithu are Raja's friends in the Jungle. They help each other in the time of distress. Once Raja rescues Ram from the clutches of a crocodile. Raja warns Sher Singh and Nagender to stop the smuggling, resulting in enmity between them. Sher Singh wants to marry his unworthy son Nagender with Pooja (Amala), the daughter of a millionaire Brijmohan (Sujit Kumar). Bharti (Shobha Khote), Sher Singh's wife, on the other hand wants that Pooja be married to her innocent nephew Buddhi Ram Aval Chand Dimagwala (Kader Khan), as she is the daughter of the friend of Buddhi's deceased father. But Pooja wants to marry Raja as he saved her from the clutches of the Nagender's lusty eyes when she went out for hunting. Pooja marries Raja against her father's wishes. Raja's well wisher and tribal leader Mangola (Sharad Saxena) performs the rites on behalf of Pooja's father. To avenge this, Nagender attempts to molest Pooja and beat Raja. Ram and Bansi come in and avert this attempt. Raja catches Sher Singh and Nagender red-handed while sending the smuggled articles out of the Jungle. Judge awards them six years rigorous imprisonment. After release from the jail, Sher Singh & Nagender find Raja and Pooja have a son Ravi (Antriksh), and trouble them a lot. The extent of Nagender's meanness crosses the boundaries with the intoxication of Ram. Ram goes berserk, destroys property, attacks Raja's family, grievously injuring Ravi. Pooja mistakes Ram, quarrels with her husband, leaves the house in sheer anger with Ravi & reaches her father's place. One day, Raja's servant Sukhiya (Asrani) comes to Brijmohan's house to convey Ram's message to Ravi. The content of Ram's message to Ravi, clearance of misunderstanding between Raja and Pooja, the fate of Sher Singh and Nagender, and Buddhi Ram's role in this, forms the rest of the story.

Cast
Mithun Chakraborty as Forest Officer Raja
Amala as Pooja
Kiran Kumar as Naagendra Singh
Sujit Kumar as Brijmohan
Kader Khan as Buddhiram
Amjad Khan as Sher Singh
Shubha Khote as Bharti Singh 
Asrani as Sukhiya
Annu Kapoor as Forest Officer
Vikas Anand as Raja's Boss
Anil Dhawan as Forest Officer Anthony
Bandini Mishra as Gilli
Sharat Saxena as Mangola
Bob Christo as Jackson
Master Antriksh as Ravi (Raja & Pooja's Son)

Crew
Director – K. Murali Mohan Rao
Screenplay – M. D. Sunder
Dialogue – Kader Khan
Producer – A. Suryanarayana
Production Company – Bhanodaya Productions
Editor – J. Narasimha Rao
Cinematographer – V. S. R. Swamy
Music Director – Rahul Dev Burman
Lyricist – Indeevar
Playback Singers – Amit Kumar, Asha Bhosle, Alka Yagnik

Soundtrack
Music of this film is by R. D. Burman with lyrics by Indeevar.

References

External links

1989 films
1980s Hindi-language films
Films scored by R. D. Burman